Karlanovo is a village in the municipality of Sandanski, in Blagoevgrad Province, Bulgaria. It is situated at the south-western foothills of the Pirin mountain range and is nestled within the Melnik Earth Pyramids.

References

Villages in Blagoevgrad Province